Nursery Days, originally released as Songs to Grow on, Volume One: Nursery Days, is an album of a collection of children's songs by American Folk singer Woody Guthrie. It was released in 1951 by Folkways Records and later re-released in 1992 with four extra songs under the name Nursery Days by Smithsonian Folkways. Several songs in the collection are instructional, helping children learn to count. Others are songs of adoration written by Guthrie with his own children in mind.

Track listing

References

External links 
 Smithsonian Folkways Recordings Release

1951 albums
Woody Guthrie albums
Children's music albums by American artists
Smithsonian Folkways albums
Folkways Records albums